Indian scientist Nandini Harinath is a rocket scientist at ISRO's (Indian Space Research Organisation) Satellite Centre in Bengaluru. She is a part of the Mars Orbiter Mission, Maangalyaan . She has co-authored a research paper on mission planning, analysis and operations—Outline of key components.             .

Life 
Nandini's first exposure to science was the popular series Star Trek on television. Her mother is a maths teacher and her father is an engineer and as a family, they were all interested in science fiction and Star Trek.

She has two daughters.

Career 

ISRO was the first job that Nandini applied to and now it's been 20 years. She has worked on 14 missions over 20 years at ISRO. She is the Project Manager, Mission Designer and served as deputy operations director on the Mars Orbiter Mission, also called Mangalyaan.

Publications 
 A Mechanism for Observed Interannual Variabilities over the Equatorial Indian Ocean
 Resourcesat-1 mission planning, analysis and operations—Outline of key components

References 

Year of birth missing (living people)
Living people
Women scientists from Karnataka
Scientists from Bangalore
Indian Space Research Organisation people